Following is a list of senators of Maine-et-Loire, people who have represented the department of Maine-et-Loire in the Senate of France.

Third Republic

Senators for Maine-et-Loire under the French Third Republic were:

 Achille Alexandre Joubert-Bonnaire (1876–1883)
 Léon Le Guay (1876–1891)
 Henri d'Andigné (1876–1895)
 Aimé Blavier (1884–1896)
 Jules Merlet (1891–1920)
 Georges de Blois (1895–1906)
 Armand-Urbain de Maillé de La Tour-Landry (1896–1903)
 Guillaume Bodinier (1897–1922)
 Dominique Delahaye (1903–1932)
 Raoul de La Bourdonnaye (1906–1911)
 Fabien Cesbron (1911–1920)
 Jules Delahaye (1920–1925)
 Olivier de Rougé (1920–1932)
 Ferdinand Bougère (1932–1933)
 Louis de Blois, (1922–1940)
 Anatole Manceau (1925–1940)
 Georges Millin de Grandmaison (1933–1940)
 Palamède de La Grandière (1934–1940)

Fourth Republic

Senators for Maine-et-Loire under the French Fourth Republic were:

 Jean Ascencio (1946–1948)
 Victor Chatenay (1948–1951)
 Emmanuel Clairefond (1946–1948)
 Étienne Rabouin (1948–1959)
 Pierre de Villoutreys de Brignac (1948–1959)
 Jean de Geoffre de Chabrignac (1951–1959)

Fifth Republic 
Senators for Maine-et-Loire under the French Fifth Republic:

References

Sources

 
Lists of members of the Senate (France) by department